Conotylidae is a family of millipedes in the order Chordeumatida. Adult millipedes in this family have 30 segments (counting the collum as the first segment and the telson as the last). There are about 19 genera and at least 60 described species in Conotylidae.

Genera

References

Further reading

 
 
 
 

Chordeumatida
Millipede families